Rickettsia japonica is a species of Rickettsia. It can cause Japanese spotted fever.

References 

Rickettsiaceae